The men's singles wheelchair tennis competition at the 2008 Summer Paralympics in Beijing was held from 8 September to 15 September at the Olympic Green Tennis Centre. The DecoTurf surface rendered the event a hardcourt competition.

Japan's Shingo Kunieda defeated the defending gold medalist Robin Ammerlaan of the Netherlands in the final, 6–3, 6–0 to win the gold medal in men's singles wheelchair tennis at the 2008 Beijing Paralympics. In the bronze medal match, the Netherlands' Maikel Scheffers defeated compatriot Ronald Vink.

Medalists 

Source: www.paralympic.org

Calendar

Seeds

Draw

Key 

 INV = Bipartite invitation
 IP = ITF place
 ALT = Alternate
 r = Retired
 w/o = Walkover

Finals

Top half

Section 1

Section 2

Bottom half

Section 3

Section 4

References 

 
 

Men's singles